ERA (formerly Era FM) is a Malaysian Malay-language radio station operated by Astro Radio Sdn. Bhd. The radio station broadcasts 24 hours a day, 7 days a week. The radio station went on air on 1 August 1998. In the past few years, this station played a wider mixture of music from the 1980s to current-day, but now it plays Malaysian and international hit songs, including Korean songs. It is also has regional stations in Kota Kinabalu and Kuching. In 2015, as according to Nielsen RAM Survey Wave #1, Era FM maintained its position as Malaysia's leading Malay-language station with over 4.8 million listeners.

History 
The frequency slot, which is 103.3 FM in Klang Valley was originally known as Classic Rock and was one of the five radio stations first introduced by AMP Radio Networks along with Hitz FM, Mix FM, Light & Easy and TalkRadio (frequency taken over by My FM, which also began broadcasting on 1 August of that year). It launched on the Malaysian FM airwaves in January 1997 after being one of Astro's audio-only channels since the launch of the satellite network in October the year before. Over the one-year period, demand grew for radio content in Bahasa Malaysia, as listeners who were exposed to AMP's English brands wanted the same formats but in other major local languages. This compelled AMP to make changes to its line-up, swapping Classic Rock to Era FM, leaving Classic Rock as an Astro-only radio station.

On 1 August 1998, Era FM went on air as the first private radio station to be broadcast completely in the Malay language, with "Hijau" by Zainal Abidin, which is a trademark for the radio station, being the first song to be played on the radio station, ending the monopoly of Malay-language radio stations run by state-run Radio RTM.

Era FM was once the leader in Malay-language FM radio stations, but has lost its popularity to its sister station, Sinar FM. In 2012, Era FM regained the top spot as the most popular radio station in Malaysia with close to 5 million listeners. Era FM is the first radio station in Malaysia to hold three records in the Malaysia Book Of Records since 1998.

On 2 January 2018, Era FM was rebranded to ERA in a move by Astro Radio to integrate multiple platforms beyond traditional radio. At the same time, a new logo was also unveiled with the rebranding.

Era in East Malaysia 
Prior to 2000, like its main sister stations, Era FM did not have any stations in Sabah and Sarawak. 

In 2010, Era FM began opt-out programming for Sabah and Sarawak in East Malaysia, with their own studio and on-the-ground team in Kota Kinabalu and Kuching, respctively; as well as local announcers and DJs conversing in Malay and different East Malaysian languages.

Between 2017 and 2018, Sabah and Sarawak opt-outs were upgraded to full-fledged local outlets, with all content originating from their respective capital cities 24 hours a day, and ending reliance with its Kuala Lumpur flagship during off-peak hours. Era FM Sabah became fully-local on 24 April 2017; Era Sarawak followed suit on 22 January 2018.

Frequencies and Availability

Internet radio
Broadcast online on SYOK website and APP
Era Nusantera
Era Flow
Era Cintan
Era K-Hit
Era Throwbaek
Erathon
Era Nurock
Era Indie

Television satellite
 Astro (television): Channel 856

Notes: Era Sabah and Era Sarawak are not available on via satellite TV Astro.

Parody 
Era was parodied as Erron in Afdlin Shauki's 2004 film, Buli.

References

External links 
 

1998 establishments in Malaysia
Radio stations established in 1998
Radio stations in Malaysia
Malay-language radio stations